High Resolution Stereo Camera (HRSC) is a camera experiment on Mars Express. A version for Earth called HRSC-AX was also developed, as was a version for Mars 96. It has four main parts: camera head, super resolution channel,  instrument frame, and digital unit. At an altitude of 250 km from Mars, SRC can produce images with a resolution of 2.3 meters/pixel of 2.35 km square Mars terrain. It has 9 channels and can produce digital terrain models. A typical image from HRSC of Mars has a resolution ranging from  12.5 for nadir (directly down) to 25 m/pixel for the farthest off-nadir shots, which can be up to 18.9 degrees.

By 2012, about 61.5% of the surface of Mars was mapped at a resolution of at least 20 meters per pixel by the Mars Express mission using this camera. Another area of study is repeat imaging, to allow the study of dynamic processes on Mars. Another trick is to make short videos of the Mars surface by taking advantage of the pushbroom nature of the detector, each section is slightly offset for a different color, but when combined each view be used to make a short animation.

Example observation
Orcus Patera, imaged by the HRSC:

See also
Trace Gas Orbiter (next ESA Mars orbiter, arrived 2016)

References

External links

 ESA - High Resolution Stereo Camera
 Aeolis Mons (Mount Sharp) and Gale - Image/HRSCview 
 Aeolis Mons (Mount Sharp) - HRSCview  (oblique view looking east) 
 HRSC + Phobos (with SRC shots overlaid)
Phobos by HRSC 
HRSC Press release archive (2004-2012)
HRSC with SRC of Victoria Crater and area near Opportunity rover's landing site
Clouds in Nilokeras Scopulus
TPS - Capturing Martian Weather in Motion - November 4, 2016
THE  HIGH  RESOLUTION  STEREO  CAMERA  (HRSC):  STATUS  AND  FACTS (2015)  (Includes graph of cumulative surface coverage by resolution, up to 2015)

Mars Express
Spacecraft instruments
Mars imagers
Stereo cameras